Live in Australia may refer to:
 Live in Australia (Chris Isaak album) – a live album by Chris Isaak
 Live in Australia with the Melbourne Symphony Orchestra – a live album by Elton John